Robert Kaplow (born  1954) is an American novelist and teacher whose coming-of-age novel was made into a film titled Me and Orson Welles. The story is about "youthful creative ambition" and has received positive reviews from The New York Times which described it as "nimble, likable and smart." Kaplow has written nine books and used to teach English language and film studies at Summit High School in New Jersey.

Early years
Kaplow graduated in 1972 from Westfield High School in Westfield, where he wrote his first satirical sketches as a student.

One of Kaplow’s latter novel is sprinkled with references to Westfield. “Westfield remains for me the geography of my youth. I’m still very drawn to the place, though I don’t live there,” Kaplow said in 2009.

He graduated from Rutgers University, the state university of New Jersey.

Me and Orson Welles
Kaplow conceived the idea for the book while being a student at Rutgers University. He saw a photo in the periodical Theatre Arts Monthly from 1937 with Orson Welles with a young man. Kaplow wondered what the young man might have been thinking. He wrote the story, but it took about nine years to find a publisher. It was made into a film by director Richard Linklater which was released in 2009. The Guardian critic Sophie Martelli described the film as a "schmaltzy yet charming coming-of-age story." Me and Orson Welles was a New York Times bestseller and the film in 2008 starred Zac Efron and Claire Danes. The movie was filmed in the Gaiety Theatre on the Isle of Man.  Kaplow's most recent novel is a satire of writers, critics, and publishers. For National Public Radio's Morning Edition, Mr. Kaplow created "Moe Moskowitz and the Punsters," a series of musical and satirical pop-culture parodies. These musical parodies were released on two CDs: Steven Spielberg, Give Me Some of Your Money and Cancel My Subscription: The Worst of NPR.

He has been a resident of Metuchen, New Jersey.

Writing letters to a house 
Kaplow admitted that he had written admiring letters to a Victorian house on the north side of Westfield. His students recalled, “He had this idea to start writing letters to the house — not the occupants but to the house.” He eventually befriended the family who lived there; they even let him housesit once.

Books published

Alex Icicle: A Romance in Ten Torrid Chapters, the comic rant of an over-educated and under-loved eighth-grader obsessively in love with a girl who doesn't know he's alive, and
Alessandra in Love, a comic tale about the romantic tribulations of a sardonic and intelligent high school junior, and
The Cat Who Killed Lillian Jackson Braun: A Parody, satirizing the books of Lilian Jackson Braun and the mystery genre, and
Me and Orson Welles: A Novel (2003), a romantic coming-of-age story set in 1937 around the founding of Orson Welles' Mercury Theatre, and
Who's Killing the Great Writers of America? (2007), a satirical murder mystery.  After Sue Grafton, Danielle Steel, Curtis Sittenfeld, and Tom Clancy all are murdered, Stephen King hunts for their killer, and
Playland: A Slightly Subversive Love Story (2022), the tale of a teenage couple attempting to navigate a life together in New York in the summer of 1972, and
The Lifers (2022), a novel about teachers.

References

External links
 Kaplow's most recent novel entitled Who's Killing the Great Writers of America?

Living people
1950s births
20th-century American novelists
People from Metuchen, New Jersey
People from Westfield, New Jersey
Rutgers University alumni
21st-century American novelists
American male novelists
20th-century American male writers
21st-century American male writers
Westfield High School (New Jersey) alumni